Jewison Francisco Bennette Villegas (born 15 June 2004) is a Costa Rican professional footballer who plays as a left winger for Sunderland and the Costa Rica national team.

Club career

Early career
Born in Heredia, Bennette started his career at Herediano. He made his senior debut on 1 August 2021 in a 3–2 defeat to Jicaral, and scored the first goal of the match after four minutes.

Sunderland
In August 2022, EFL Championship side Sunderland announced they had signed Bennette to a four-year deal. He made his debut for his new club on 14 September, replacing Corry Evans as a substitute against Reading. In his second match for Sunderland against Watford, he scored his first goal.

International career
Bennette played for the Costa Rica under-15 team in 2019. He trained with the Costa Rica national team in summer 2021 ahead of the 2021 CONCACAF Gold Cup, and made his senior international debut for Costa Rica in a 0–0 draw against El Salvador on 21 August 2021, becoming the youngest player to represent Costa Rica internationally, at 17 years and 2 months.

He played in Costa Rica's 2022 World Cup qualification fixtures against Canada and Honduras in November 2021, becoming Costa Rica's youngest player to feature in World Cup qualifying. Bennette became crucial for the team, as he assisted Joel Campbell to score the lone goal at the play-off match against New Zealand to seal Costa Rica's spot at the 2022 FIFA World Cup. On 23 September he scored his first two international goals in a friendly against South Korea. In November 2022 Bennette was named to the 2022 FIFA World Cup squad for Costa Rica.

Personal life
His father, Jewisson Bennette, also played as a footballer for Herediano and the Costa Rica national team, as did his uncle Try Bennett. He is the older brother of twins Nick and Mike.

Career statistics

Club

International

International goals

Honours 
Herediano

 Liga FPD: 2021–22
 Supercopa de Costa Rica: 2022

References

2004 births
Living people
Costa Rican footballers
People from Heredia (canton)
Association football wingers
C.S. Herediano footballers
Liga FPD players
Sunderland A.F.C. players
Costa Rica international footballers
Costa Rican expatriate footballers
Costa Rican expatriate sportspeople
Costa Rican expatriate sportspeople in England
Expatriate footballers in England
2022 FIFA World Cup players